In computing, the FLEX language was developed by Alan Kay in the late 1960s while exploring ideas that would later evolve into the Smalltalk programming language.

References

Programming languages created in the 1960s